Sixth Sense is a South Korean television program that aired on tvN, from September 3 to October 29, 2020, every Thursday at 20:40 (KST), and from June 25 to September 24, 2021, every Friday at 20:40 for its second season.

On December 27, 2021, it was announced that the third season will start filming in February 2022 with planned broadcast in the first half of 2022.

The third season was originally scheduled to air on March 11, 2022, but after producer-director (PD) Jeong Chul-min and cast members Lee Sang-yeob, Mijoo and Jessi tested positive for COVID-19 on February 23, the premiere date was postponed to March 18.

Overview
For Season 1, the cast members, together with a guest (known as the Sixth Man), visit three different places (or people). One of the three is entirely fabricated from scratch by the production team, and the cast members and the Sixth Man have to figure out which one is entirely fabricated, by using their "sixth senses" to analyze every detail of the three.

The correct voters will divide 6 gold persimmons among themselves as a prize, and the rest who did not vote for the correct one will pick one person among them to endure the punishment, which is to do the opening of the next episode without their eyebrows (if the Sixth Man is picked, they will post photos without eyebrows on their social media). If only one person guessed correctly, no gold persimmons would be given.

For Season 2, some changes have been made:
 The correct voters will each get 1 gold persimmon.
 The cast member(s) who have won the most episodes will get a big prize at the end of the season.
 No punishment will be given.

For Season 3, major changes have been made:
 The whole team (the cast members and the Sixth Man) will now decide which of the three choices is fake instead of voting individually. Beginning the second episode of the season, the cast members and the Sixth Man will be split into two teams.
 There is a spy for each episode, which is either a cast member or the Sixth Man. The spy's task is to mislead the other cast members and/or the Sixth Man into picking the incorrect answer, having been informed of the fabricate by the production team prior to the filming of the episode. The cast and/or Sixth Man also has to predict who is the spy among them.
 If the cast and/or Sixth Man picks the incorrect choice, the spy (and the production team) wins. The spy loses if the cast and/or Sixth Man picks the correct choice.
 Lucky Balls have replaced the gold persimmon as the reward. Throughout the season, the cast members (and the Sixth Man) are given lucky balls labeled with their names if they win. These are then placed in a raffle machine which will randomly pick a winner (who will receive a big prize) at the end of the season.
 The team that picks the fabricate (except the spy) each gets 1 Lucky Ball. Conversely, the spy wins 1 Lucky Ball per team if both teams do not select the fabricate.
 The team (except the spy) each gets 1 additional Lucky Ball if the spy was correctly predicted. Conversely, the spy wins 1 additional Lucky Ball if the spy was not correctly predicted provided none of the teams guessed the fabricate.

Cast

Current cast 
 Yoo Jae-suk
 Oh Na-ra
 Jessi
 Mijoo
 Lee Sang-yeob (since Season 2)

On Leave cast 
 Jeon So-min (Season 1–2; guest, Season 3)

Episodes

Season 1 (2020)

Season 2 (2021)

Season 3 (2022)

Lucky Ball Tally

Viewership

Awards and nominations

Notes

References

External links
  
  

South Korean reality television series
2020 South Korean television series debuts
2020 South Korean television series endings
TVN (South Korean TV channel) original programming
Korean-language television shows